Joseph Herbert Weatherly (May 29, 1922 – January 19, 1964) was an American stock car racing driver.  Weatherly was inducted into the Motorsports Hall of Fame of America in 2009 after winning NASCAR's Grand National Series championships in 1962 and 1963, three AMA Grand National Championships, and two NASCAR Modified championships.

Personality
Weatherly enjoyed behaving outrageously. He once took practice laps wearing a Peter Pan suit. Moreover, he frequently stayed out partying until the early hours, usually with fellow driver and friend Curtis Turner. This behavior earned him the nickname the "Clown Prince of Racing".  In 1956 at Raleigh, while racing in the convertible series, Weatherly's engine blew.  With the help of Ralph Liguori pushing from behind, he displayed showmanship to the fullest extent by crossing the finish line while standing in a "chariot of fire".

Motorcycle career
He won three American Motorcycle Association (AMA) nationals between 1946 and 1950, including the prestigious Laconia Classic 100 Mile road race in 1948. In 1998 he was inducted into the AMA Motorcycle Hall of Fame.

NASCAR career
Weatherly began racing cars in 1950. "Little Joe" won the first modified event that he entered. He won 49 of the 83 car races that he entered that season. In 1952 he won the NASCAR Modified National crown, and he again won 49 of 83 car races that he entered. Weatherly won 52 more races in 1953 and won the Modified National crown again.

Weatherly had a partial interest in what would later be called Richmond International Raceway from 1955 to 1956.

In 1956 he moved into the NASCAR Grand National series. He drove a factory-sponsored Ford car for Pete DePaolo Engineering. For the next two seasons, Weatherly drove for Holman Moody.

In 1959, Weatherly recorded six top-5 finishes and ten top-10s. He narrowly lost the 1959 Hickory 250 to Junior Johnson; being out lapped twice before the race was concluded.

Weatherly won NASCAR's Most Popular Driver Award in 1961.

He won two consecutive championships, in 1962 and 1963, for Bud Moore Engineering. Moore did not have enough resources to run the full season, so Weatherly frequently "bummed a ride".

Death
Weatherly died on January 19, 1964, from head injuries sustained in a racing accident at the fifth race of the 1964 season, at Riverside International Raceway. His head went outside the car and struck a retaining wall, killing him instantly.  Weatherly was not wearing a shoulder harness and did not have a window net installed on his vehicle, because he was afraid of being trapped in a burning car.

Weatherly was the first driver to die during the season after winning the Cup Series championship; since his death, this has occurred just one other time, as 1992 series champion Alan Kulwicki lost his life early in the 1993 season. Unlike Weatherly, who died in a racing accident, Kulwicki was killed in a plane crash. 

Weatherly's fatal crash, combined with Richard Petty's crash at Darlington in 1970, eventually led NASCAR to mandate the window net seven years later, in 1971.  

Weatherly's grave marker is a sculpture of Riverside Raceway, with a checkered flag marking the spot of his fatal crash.

Awards
He was named one of NASCAR's 50 Greatest Drivers in 1998.
 
He was inducted into the Motorsports Hall of Fame of America in 2009.

Weatherly was inducted into the NASCAR Hall of Fame on January 30, 2015.

Motorsports career results

NASCAR
(key) (Bold – Pole position awarded by qualifying time. Italics – Pole position earned by points standings or practice time. * – Most laps led. ** – All laps led.)

Grand National Series

Daytona 500

References

External links
Profile, joeweatherly.com
 
Motorcycle Hall of Fame

1922 births
1964 deaths
American motorcycle racers
AMA Grand National Championship riders
Burials in Virginia
Filmed deaths in motorsport
International Motorsports Hall of Fame inductees
NASCAR Cup Series champions
NASCAR drivers
Sportspeople from Norfolk, Virginia
Racing drivers from Virginia
Racing drivers who died while racing
Sports deaths in California
NASCAR Hall of Fame inductees